Caduca is a genus of moths of the family Noctuidae.

Species
Caduca albopunctata (Walker, 1858)

References
Natural History Museum Lepidoptera genus database

Calpinae